The 2001 NCAA Division I softball season, play of college softball in the United States organized by the National Collegiate Athletic Association (NCAA) at the Division I level, began in February 2001.  The season progressed through the regular season, many conference tournaments and championship series, and concluded with the 2001 NCAA Division I softball tournament and 2001 Women's College World Series.  The Women's College World Series, consisting of the eight remaining teams in the NCAA Tournament and held in held in Oklahoma City at ASA Hall of Fame Stadium, ended on May 28, 2001.

Conference standings

Women's College World Series
The 2001 NCAA Women's College World Series took place from May 24 to May 28, 2001 in Oklahoma City.

Season leaders
Batting
Batting average: .455 – Oli Keohohou, BYU Cougars
RBIs: 84 – Toni Mascarenas, Arizona Wildcats
Home runs: 25 – Toni Mascarenas, Arizona Wildcats

Pitching
Wins: 39-8 – Kristi Hanks, Iowa Hawkeyes
ERA: 0.46 (10 ER/152.0 IP) – Amanda Freed, UCLA Bruins
Strikeouts: 421 – Amanda Renfroe, Texas Tech Red Raiders

Records
NCAA Division I season winning percentage:
32-0 (100%) – Jennie Finch, Arizona Wildcats

Freshman class winning percentage:
27-2 (93%) – Keira Goerl, UCLA Bruins

Sophomore class walks:
93 – Veronica Nelson, California Golden Bears

Junior class consecutive wins streak:
32 – Jennie Finch, Arizona Wildcats; February 2-May 28, 2001

Awards
Honda Sports Award Softball:
Jennie Finch, Arizona Wildcats

All America Teams
The following players were members of the All-American Teams.

First Team

Second Team

Third Team

References

External links